Cristian Manuel Rojas Sanhueza (born 19 December 1985) is a Chilean former footballer who played as a defender.

Personal life
He is usually known by his nickname, Chapa.

At the same time he was a footballer, he became a Risk Manager and got a Sports Management Degree.

References

External links
 
 
 Cristian Rojas at playmakerstats.com (English version of ceroacero.es)

1985 births
Living people
People from Antofagasta Province
Chilean footballers
C.D. Antofagasta footballers
Cobreloa footballers
Curicó Unido footballers
Chilean Primera División players
Primera B de Chile players
Association football defenders